Emily Beecroft (born 19 November 1999) is an Australian Paralympic swimmer. She represented Australia at the 2016 Rio Paralympics and the 2020 Tokyo Paralympics. She won a silver and bronze medal at the 2020 Tokyo Paralympics.

Personal life
Beecroft was born on 19 November 1999, a triplet with two sisters. She lives in Traralgon, Victoria. She was born deaf in her left ear and with a right arm limb deficiency. In 2020, she is studying part-time media and communications at La Trobe University.

Swimming career
Beecroft played netball and participated in athletics, but eventually decided to concentrate on swimming. In 2010, she competed won ten medals at the School Sports Championships, and was awarded the Sportsmanship Award in 2012. Competing for the Traralgon Swimming Club, she swam a personal best time to take the bronze medal in the 50 metre breaststroke multi-class event at the National Open Championships in May 2013.

By March 2015, Beecroft was ranked in the top five in the world in the 50 metre butterfly, 50 metre and 100 metre freestyle and in the top 15 in all her other events. She made her international debut at the US Para Championships in Bismarck, North Dakota, in December 2015, where she was officially classified S9, and swam second in the 50 metre butterfly, and 50 metre and 100 metre freestyle events.  She won gold in the 50 metre freestyle and 100 metre butterfly events at the 2015 Australian Open Championships, and the 2016 Australian Age Championships.

At the 2016 Australian Swimming Championships in Adelaide, coached by Dean Gooch, Beecroft won gold in the 50 metre and 100 metre freestyle and 50 metre butterfly events. All three swims were personal bests, but the 31.93  second 50-metre butterfly swim also broke the national record set by Madeleine Scott back in 2009. On 14 April 2016, she was named part of the Australian swim team for the 2016 Summer Paralympics in Rio.

In September 2016, Beecroft represented Australia at the Rio Paralympics in four different S9 classification events. Beecroft qualified for three finals from her four events, however was unsuccessful in having any podium finishes. She finished fourth in 50m Freestyle S9, sixth in 100m Freestyle S9 and 6th in 100m Butterfly S9. Beecroft also competed in 200m Individual Medley SM9 but did not advance to the finals. In response to being asked 'What's the purpose of going to Rio?' Beecroft replied saying "I'm going there to race and win!"

At the 2018 Commonwealth Games, Gold Coast, Beecroft finished fourth in the Women's 100m Freestyle S9.

At the 2020 Tokyo Paralympics, Beecroft, together with her team of Ellie Cole, Isabella Vincent, and Ashleigh McConnell won a silver medal in the Women's 4x100m Freestyle 34 pts with a time of 4:26.82, two seconds behind the winners, Italy. She also won a bronze medal in the 34pts Women's 4x100m Medley 34 pts. Her team of Ellie Cole, Keira Stephens and Isabella Vincent clocked 4:55.70. In the Women's 100 m freestyle S9 Beecroft qualified for the final but finished eighth and did not win a medal 

At the 2022 World Para Swimming Championships, Madeira Beecroft won three medals - gold in the Mixed 4 × 100 m medley relay 34 pts and silver in Women's 100 m Freestyle S9 and Women's 100 m Butterfly S9.

At the 2022 Commonwealth Games, Birmingham, England, she won the silver medal in the Women's 100 m freestyle S9. 

Beecroft was named the 2016 Victorian Young Athlete of the Year.

References

External links
 
 
 

1999 births
Living people
Australian female freestyle swimmers
Australian female butterfly swimmers
Female Paralympic swimmers of Australia
Swimmers at the 2016 Summer Paralympics
Swimmers at the 2020 Summer Paralympics
Swimmers at the 2018 Commonwealth Games
Swimmers at the 2022 Commonwealth Games
Sportswomen from Victoria (Australia)
S9-classified Paralympic swimmers
People from Traralgon
Medalists at the World Para Swimming Championships
Medalists at the 2020 Summer Paralympics
Paralympic silver medalists for Australia
Paralympic bronze medalists for Australia
Commonwealth Games medallists in swimming
Commonwealth Games silver medallists for Australia
21st-century Australian women
Medallists at the 2022 Commonwealth Games